Yoon Jun-Ha is a South Korean football player who currently plays for Daejeon Citizen.

On March 8, 2009, he scored debut goal and the final goal in the 1–0 against Jeju United. This goal is the first goal of club, too. He made three goal from first game against Jeju to third game against Busan by substitute consecutively.

On 5 January 2012, Yoon left Gangwon for Incheon United.

Club career statistics

References

External links
 

1987 births
Living people
South Korean footballers
Gangwon FC players
Incheon United FC players
Daejeon Hana Citizen FC players
Ansan Mugunghwa FC players
K League 1 players
K League 2 players
Association football forwards